Microphysogobio rapidus is a species of cyprinid fish endemic to South Korea.

References

Cyprinid fish of Asia
Fish described in 1999
Microphysogobio